Rent a Pocher was a German television show hosted by comedian Oliver Pocher. The weekly late-night show ran on Thursdays on the commercial television channel ProSieben and was produced by Brainpool. On the show, in addition to comedy bits and celebrity guests, Pocher offered to "rent" himself out to a viewer. For example, Pocher was rented as a babysitter, to pick grapes for wine and as an undertaker's assistant.
The final episode aired on 14 April 2006.

Awards 
 2004: Deutscher Fernsehpreis in the category "Best Comedy"
 2004 & 2005: Deutscher Comedypreis as "The best comedy show"

External links
Official website - features clips from past shows (in German)
Official Oliver Pocher site - information concerning Oliver Pocher' tour "It's my life"

2003 German television series debuts
2006 German television series endings
ProSieben original programming
German television talk shows
German-language television shows
Television series by Banijay